Depoy is an unincorporated community located in Muhlenberg County, Kentucky, United States.

The community was a stop on the Illinois Central Gulf railroad, and was named for railroad agent Elmer Depoyster.

Notable people
Warren Oates, actor

References

Unincorporated communities in Muhlenberg County, Kentucky
Unincorporated communities in Kentucky